Dag Olov Larsson (born 1960) is a Swedish politician and former member of the Riksdag, the national legislature. A member of the Social Democratic Party, he represented Stockholm Municipality between September 2018 and June 2022.

Larsson is the son of engineer Bengt Andersson and the behavioural scientist Annmarie Larsson. He studied at the Stockholm Institute of Education. 

In January 2022, a police investigation into a Thai massage parlor in Östermalm illicitly functioning as a brothel found Instagram messages dating from December 2021 between a sex worker at the brothel and Larsson. Larsson claimed his account had been compromised. Despite not being suspected of a crime, Larsson resigned from the Riksdag in June 2022 after Aftonbladet broke the news.

References

1960 births
Living people
Members of the Riksdag 2018–2022
Members of the Riksdag from the Social Democrats